The 2011–12 Kansas State Wildcats men's basketball team represented Kansas State University in the 2011–12 NCAA Division I men's basketball season. The head coach was Frank Martin, who served in his 5th year at the helm of the Wildcats. The team played its home games in Bramlage Coliseum in Manhattan, Kansas, as they have done so since 1988.  Kansas State is a member of the Big 12 Conference.  The team set a school record for fewest points allowed in the shot clock era. The team concluded the conference season with 10–8 to finish in 5th place in the Big 12. They were defeated by Baylor in the quarterfinals in the 2012 Big 12 men's basketball tournament. The team made to the 2012 NCAA Division I men's basketball tournament for the third straight year, where they beat Southern Miss in the second round, and lost to Syracuse in the third round to close the season with a 22–11 record.

Preseason
The team played their home games at the Bramlage Coliseum, which has a capacity of 12,528. They are in their 16th season as a member of the Big 12 Conference. Coming back from their 2010–11 season, they compiled a record of 22–11 and advanced to the Round of 32 of the 2011 NCAA Division I men's basketball tournament.

Departures

Class of 2011–12 Recruits

Schedule

|-
!colspan=12 style="background:#512888; color:#FFFFFF;"| Exhibition
|-

|-
!colspan=12 style="background:#512888; color:#FFFFFF;"| Regular Season
|-

|-
!colspan=12 style="background:#512888; color:#FFFFFF;"| Big 12 Season
|-

|-
!colspan=12 style="background:#512888; color:#FFFFFF;"| 2012 Big 12 men's basketball tournament
|-

|-
!colspan=12 style="background:#512888; color:#FFFFFF;"| 2012 NCAA tournament
|-

Rankings

Roster

Depth chart

See also
2011-12 NCAA Division I men's basketball season
2011–12 NCAA Division I men's basketball rankings
2012 Big 12 men's basketball tournament
2012 NCAA Division I men's basketball tournament

References

Kansas State Wildcats men's basketball seasons
Kansas State
Kansas State
Wild
Wild